Lars Madsen may refer to:

Lars Jørgen Madsen (1871–1925), Danish Olympic rifle shooter
Lars Møller Madsen (born 1981), Danish team handball player
Lars Madsen (actor) in Magic in Town
Lars Madsen (cyclist) from Cycling at the 1999 Pan American Games
Lars Madsén from Långaryd family